Longhurst code refers to a set of geospatial four-letter geocodes for referencing geographic regions in oceanography.

The set of 56 geocodes represent biogeochemical provinces that partition the pelagic environment.  It is assumed that each province represents a unique set of environmental conditions.

They are named after Alan R. Longhurst, the author of "Ecological Geography of the Sea", the textbook in which these codes are defined.

These codes have also been used in bioinformatic databases such as IMG to represent sample origins for sequenced microbial genomes, as a supplement to latitude and longitude coordinate metrics.

References

Geocodes
Oceanographical terminology